Mary Rice Hayes Allen (March 2, 1875 – October 10, 1935) was an American educator. She served as the president of Virginia Theological Seminary and College from 1906 through 1908.

Biography
Hayes Allen née Rice was born on March 2, 1875, in Harrisonburg, Virginia. She was the illegitimate daughter of former slave Malinda Rice and a former Confederate general, John R. Jones. She attended Hartshorn Memorial College. In 1895 she married the educator Gregory W. Hayes with whom she had seven children, five surviving infancy.

In 1891 Gregory Hayes became the second president of the Virginia Theological Seminary and College (now Virginia University of Lynchburg). He served as president until his death in 1906. Hayes Allen served as president immediately following her husband's death through 1908 when James Robert Lincoln Diggs took over.

In 1911 Hayes Allen married William Allen with whom she had three children. The couple settled in Montclair, New Jersey. Hayes Allen advocated for racial equality in the local schools, fighting a losing battle to desegregate the Montclair public school. She was also active in the Montclair chapter of the National Association for the Advancement of Colored People (NAACP) in the 1920s through the 1930s. She died on October 10, 1935.

Hayes Allen's daughter, Carrie Allen McCray, wrote a biography of her mother entitled Freedom's Child: The Life of a Confederate General's Black Daughter which was published by Algonquin Books in 1998.

In 2018 the Virginia Capitol Foundation announced that Hayes Allen's name would be in the Virginia Women's Monument's glass Wall of Honor.

References

External links
Letter from Mary Rice Hayes-Allen to W. E. B. Du Bois, February 18, 1918
  

1875 births
1935 deaths
Educators from Virginia
20th-century African-American women
20th-century African-American people